Mae is an English feminine given name. It is a variant of May, and derives from the month of May, which is named after the Roman goddess Maia. In Portuguese Mãe means mother. Mae may refer to:

In music:
 Mae Moore, Canadian singer-songwriter
 Mae Muller, English singer-songwriter

In acting:
 Mae Bramhall (c. 1861 – 1897), American actress and writer
 Mae Busch (1891–1946), Australian actress
 Mae Clarke (1910-1992), American actress
 Mae Marsh (1894–1968), American movie actress
 Mae Martin (born 1987), Canadian comedian and actor
 Mae Murray (1885–1965), American silent film actress
 Mae Questel (1908–1998), American actress
 Mae West (1893–1980), American actress (after whom are named a variety of otherwise unrelated items)
 Mae Whitman (born 1988), American actress

In other fields:
 Mae Brussell (1922–1988), American radio personality
 Mae Jemison (born 1956), the first African-American woman to travel to space
 Mae Schmidle (1927–2019), American politician
 Mae Schunk (born 1934), the 45th Lieutenant Governor of Minnesota
 Mae Tischer (1928–2018), American politician

References